San Andreas: The Original Mixtape is the debut mixtape by American West Coast rapper Young Maylay. It was released on July 5, 2005.

Featured artists
The album features all artists who were affiliated with Young Maylay at the time. It includes King T, Westside Connection member WC, Roscoe, Kaylo, Rodney O, Tugg Boat, Tristate, Da Homie E, Bad Azz, Deadly Threat, Rappin' 4-Tay, 40 Glocc, Speedy and Gangsta Granny.

Sales promotions
It was made for purchase over his official site and it has had numerous sales promotions for it. These included a free autographed youngmaylay.net sticker, at customers request, a signed copy of the CD, and for the first 100 orders, they went into a drawing where 50 winners would receive a personalized MP3 recording of their favorite CJ quote from San Andreas.

Album content
The mixtape was based heavily on the game GTA: San Andreas and the character Maylay portrayed in it, the protagonist Carl "CJ" Johnson, using samples from the game, an album cover with a GTA style and the San Andreas Theme Song.
The album has a G-Funk style song called "Comen Get Us".

Track listing

References

2005 mixtape albums
2005 debut albums
Hip hop albums by American artists
West Coast hip hop albums